Labeobarbus lagensis is a species of ray-finned fish in the genus Labeobarbus from Nigeria and possibly Ghana.

References 
 

lagensis
Taxa named by Albert Günther
Fish described in 1868
Fish of Africa